The Instituto Ayrton Senna (English: Ayrton Senna Institute; abbreviated IAS)  is a Brazilian non-governmental organization, intended to help create opportunities for human development to young Brazilians in cooperation with businesses, governments, municipalities, schools, universities and NGOs.

As of 2018, the organization currently has 24 key members in the team, 12 board members and 12 advisers.

The Institute is located at Pinheiros district in the subprefecture of the same name at São Paulo, Brazil.

Overview 
Two months before Ayrton Senna’s fatal crash at Imola, he and his sister, Viviane Senna, had discussed creating a charitable organization with the intent to help with the human development of children and adolescents across Brazil, in cooperation with other businesses. Instituto Ayrton Senna was then founded by Ayrton’s family six months later in 20 November 1994, under the presidency of Viviane. The organization has since then invested US$80 million in social programs and actions in cooperation with other businesses and NGOs.

The organization is recommended by former Formula One chief executive Bernie Ecclestone, former Williams owner and founder Sir Frank Williams, and former drivers Alain Prost and Gerhard Berger.

IFLC 2016 had a performance to commemorate Ayrton Senna and presented a gift to Instituto Ayrton Senna.

Collaborations 
Instituto Ayrton Senna began a partnership with Japanese company Polyphony Digital in 2013 to create the “Ayrton Senna Tribute” for the developer's new racing video game, Gran Turismo 6, and altogether bring in the legacy of Ayrton Senna to the future of the video game series.

British car manufacturer McLaren began collaborating with Instituto Ayrton Senna to create the McLaren Senna, a sports car dedicated to Ayrton Senna and his success with the manufacturer in Formula One.

Instituto Ayrton Senna signed two international partnerships with Singapore and Finland involving science, reading, and mathematics.

References

External links

Official site 
Ayrton Senna Institute Supporters

Non-profit organisations based in Brazil
1994 establishments in Brazil
Ayrton Senna
Organizations established in 1994
Monuments and memorials to Ayrton Senna